The Self-portrait is a self-portrait by Anthony van Dyck, produced around 1640. It was purchased for the National Portrait Gallery, London in 2014.

External links
http://www.npg.org.uk/whatson/van-dyck/home.php
Catalogue entry

1640 paintings

1640